The 1962 Wellington City mayoral election was part of the New Zealand local elections held that same year. In 1962, elections were held for the Mayor of Wellington plus other local government positions including fifteen city councillors. The polling was conducted using the standard first-past-the-post electoral method.

Background
Incumbent mayor Frank Kitts was re-elected decisively for a third term over deputy mayor Bill Arcus, substantially increasing his majority. Initially Sam Barnett, the former Secretary of Justice and Controller-General of Police, was to be the Citizens' Association nomination for the mayoralty but he withdrew his nomination at the last minute. Bill Young, an executive member of the  electorate committee of the National Party was also approached to stand for mayor, but after giving consideration to doing so, he declined to stand.

The election was also notable due to the success of Ralph Love, who became the first Maori candidate to be elected as a city councillor in Wellington's history. John Jeffries was also to become the youngest ever candidate elected as a councillor (at that time) at age 33.

Mayoralty results

Councillor results

 
 
 
 
 
 
 
 
 
 
 
 
 
 
 
 
 
 
 
 
 
 
 
 
  
 
 
 
 
 
 

 

 

 

 
 

Table footnotes:

References

Mayoral elections in Wellington
1962 elections in New Zealand
Politics of the Wellington Region
1960s in Wellington
October 1962 events in New Zealand